David Raymond Layzer (December 31, 1925 – August 16, 2019) was an American astrophysicist, cosmologist, and the Donald H. Menzel Professor Emeritus of Astronomy at Harvard University. He is known for his cosmological theory of the expansion of the universe, which postulates that its order and information are increasing despite the second law of thermodynamics. He is also known for being one of the most notable researchers who advocated for a Cold Big Bang theory. When he proposed this theory in 1966, he suggested it would solve Olbers' paradox, which holds that the night sky on Earth should be much brighter than it actually is. He also published several articles critiquing hereditarian views on human intelligence, such as those of Richard Herrnstein and Arthur Jensen. He became a member of the American Academy of Arts and Sciences since 1963, and was also a member of Divisions B and J of the International Astronomical Union. He died in Belmont at the age of 93 in 2019.

References

External links
Profile at the Information Philosopher
 David Layzer Memorial Website

1925 births
2019 deaths
Scientists from Cleveland
American astrophysicists
American cosmologists
Harvard University faculty
Harvard University alumni
Fellows of the American Academy of Arts and Sciences
American astronomers